Vatten is a hamlet  south east of Dunvegan, on the eastern shore of Loch Vatten, on the Isle of Skye, in the council area of Highland, Scotland. In 2011 it had a population of 315.

History 
The name "Vatten" came from Old Norse vatn ("water"). Vatten had a school, it closed in 1984 and the pupils transferred to Dunvegan.

References 

Populated places in the Isle of Skye